Meliah Rage is an American heavy metal band from Boston, Massachusetts, formed in 1987 by guitarist/songwriter Anthony Nichols. They are characterized primarily as thrash metal with more classical metal melodies. The band has released 12 albums. Its current members include Anthony Nichols, Jim Koury, Darren Lourie, Paul Souza, and Stu Dowie. They at one time featured Godsmack frontman Sully Erna on drums, who appeared on the Unfinished Business album.

The band went on hiatus in January 2021.

Timeline

Discography 
 Kill to Survive (1988, CBS/Epic Records)
 Live Kill (1989, CBS/Epic Records)
 Solitary Solitude (1990, CBS/Epic Records)
 Death Valley Dream (1996, BSR/Locomotive Records)
 Unfinished Business (2002, Screaming Ferret Wreckords; recorded 1992)
 Barely Human (2004, Screaming Ferret Wreckords)
 The Deep and Dreamless Sleep (2006, SFW/Universal Fontana)
 Masquerade (2009, Metro City Records/SFW)
 Dead to the World (2011, Metal on Metal Records)
 Warrior (2014, Metal on Metal Records)
 Before the Kill (compilation 2015, Metal on Metal Records)
 Idol Hands (2018, Metal on Metal Records)

References

Further reading

External links 
 Official Meliah Rage site

Musical groups from Boston
Heavy metal musical groups from Massachusetts
American power metal musical groups
American thrash metal musical groups
Musical groups established in 1987